Lanny Joon is a Korean-American actor. He is best known for his roles in films Takers (2010), Black Gold (2011), West 32nd (2007), and most recently Baby Driver (2017). He has appeared in single episodes of several TV series.

In West 32nd (2007) by Michael Kang, he stars alongside John Cho, Grace Park, and Jun-seong Kim. He played the role of JD in Baby Driver (2017), opposite Jamie Foxx and Ansel Elgort. Joon also stars as the protagonist John in Ktown Cowboys (2010), directed by Daniel DPD Park, which won Best Feature Film at the Los Angeles Asian Pacific Film Festival.

He has also appeared in one episode of the TV shows, such as: Castle, The Big Bang Theory, Wizards of Waverly Place, in J. J. Abrams' Undercovers, The Forgotten, Numb3rs, CSI: Crime Scene Investigation, Hawaii Five-0 and more.

Joon is a graduate of New York University (NYU), where he majored in Broadcast Journalism and Theater.

Filmography

Film

Television

References

External links

Lanny Joon on Twitter
Asians on Film – Lanny Joon

American male actors of Korean descent
Tisch School of the Arts alumni
Year of birth missing (living people)
People from Cincinnati
Living people
21st-century American male actors